The Bentley 6½ Litre and the high-performance Bentley Speed Six were rolling chassis in production from 1926 to 1930. The Speed Six, introduced in 1928, would become the most successful racing Bentley. Two Bentley Speed Sixes became known as the Blue Train Bentleys after their owner Woolf Barnato's involvement in the Blue Train Races of 1930.

Background
By 1924 Bentley had been in business for five years. He decided to build a larger chassis than the 3 Litre, with a smoother, more powerful engine.  The new chassis would be more suitable for the large, heavy limousine bodies that many of his customers were then putting on his sports car chassis. The resulting car would be more refined and better suited for comfortable general motoring.

Prototype race
Bentley built a development mule with a 4¼ L straight-six engine derived from the 3 Litre's four cylinder engine. To disguise the car's origin, it had a large, wedge-shaped radiator and was registered as a "Sun". The chassis was given a large very light weight Weymann-type tourer body built by Freestone and Webb.

W. O. Bentley combined one of his road tests of the Sun with a trip to see the 1924 French Grand Prix in Lyon. On his return trip to the ferry at Dieppe, W. O. encountered another disguised car at a three-way junction.  W. O. and the Rolls-Royce test driver recognized each other and began racing each other along the routes nationales. This street race continued until the Rolls-Royce driver's hat blew off and he had to stop to retrieve it.  The Sun's tyres were heavily worn when W.O. got to the ferry at Dieppe.

6½ Litre 

With a  stroke, the engine had a displacement of 6.6 L Like the four-cylinder engine, Bentley's straight-6 included overhead camshaft, 4 valves per cylinder, and a single-piece engine block and cylinder head cast in iron, which eliminated the need for a head gasket. In base form, with a single Smiths 5-jet carburettor, twin ignition magnetos, and a compression ratio of 4.4:1, the Bentley 6½ Litre delivered  at 3500 RPM.

Although based on the 3 Litre's engine, the 6½ engine incorporated many improvements. The 3 Litre's cone-type clutch was replaced by a dry-plate design that incorporated a clutch brake for fast gear changes,  and the car had power-assisted four-wheel brakes with finned drums. The front brakes had 4 leading shoes per drum.  By operating a patented compensating device, the driver could adjust all four brakes to correct for wear while the car was moving, which was particularly advantageous during races.

Speed Six 

The Bentley Speed Six chassis was introduced in 1928 as a more sporting version of the Bentley 6½ Litre. With a single-port block, two SU carburettors, a high-performance camshaft, and a compression ratio of 5.3:1, the Speed Six's engine produced  at 3500 rpm.

The Criminal Investigation Department of the Western Australia Police operated two saloon-bodied examples as patrol cars.

In March 1930, Barnato raced against the Blue Train in a Speed Six with H. J. Mulliner saloon coachwork, reaching his club in London before the train was due in the station at Calais. It had generally been believed that the car in the race was a Gurney Nutting Sportsman Coupé, but that coupé was delivered to Barnato in May 1930, more than a month after the race.

Factory racing cars 
Successful in racing, these cars won the 24 Hours of Le Mans in 1929 and 1930 with Bentley Boys drivers "Tim" Birkin, Glen Kidston, and Woolf Barnato, the chairman of Bentley Motors.

Production 
 6½ Litre: 362
 Speed Six: 182

Gallery

Notes

References

Print

Online

6
Cars introduced in 1926
1930s cars
24 Hours of Le Mans race cars
Le Mans winning cars